Makis Solomos (born 1962) a Franco-Greek musicologist specialising in contemporary music and particularly in the work of Iannis Xenakis. He is also one of the specialists of Adorno's thought. His work focuses on the issue of sound ecology and decay. He has published articles and books and participates in meetings and symposia. In 2005, he also participated in the creation of the magazine "Filigranes" which aims to broaden the field of musicology.

Biography 
Makis Solomos has lived in Paris since 1980. He studied musical composition with Yoshihisa Taira and Sergio Ortega and later studied musicology at the Paris-Sorbonne University. He taught at the Paul Valéry University, Montpellier III until 2010. He is a professor at the université Paris VIII and a junior member of the institut universitaire de France.

Research areas 
In his writings, Makis Solomos tries to marry the analytical, historical and hermeneutical approaches. In addition to his writings on the work of Xenakis, his research focuses on aspects of recent music (Webern, Varèse, Boulez, Criton, Vaggione, Di Scipio, spectral music, electronic music, popular music, and in particular the aesthetic questions from a perspective inspired by the philosophical thought of Adorno). Defending a radical modernist aesthetic approach to contemporary music, he particularly criticizes the aesthetics that he considers conservative in particular neoclassicism and postmodernism, (postmodernism being clearly in modernity). He remains relatively distant from the aesthetics known as "moderate modernists".

He is also positioned against historicism, that is to say, a linear reading of the history of music, which consists in considering the evolution of aesthetics only in a uniform sense, relying only on the milestones that constitute the great names of history (the "winners" to use Solomos' term). He defends the idea that musical evolution throughout history is a complex and multifaceted movement of different conceptions and aesthetics. 

His recent work has focused on themes such as the emergence of sound, sound ecology and decay, for which he has devoted books, articles or papers to symposiums.

Bibliography 
 Le devenir du matériau musical au XXe siècle, in SOULEZ Antonia, SCHMITZ François, SEBESTIK Jan (ed)., Musique, rationalité,  : L'harmonie, du monde au matériau, Cahiers de philosophie du  (No 3), Paris, L’Harmattan, 1998; (pp. 137–151)
 Notes sur la spatialisation de la musique et l'émergence du son, in GENEVOIS Hugues, ORLAREY Yann (ed)., Le son et l'espace, Lyon, Aléas, 1998; (pp. 105–125). (Musique et Sciences).
 Schaeffer phénoménologue, in Ouïr, entendre, écouter, comprendre après Schaeffer, Paris, Buchet-Chastel / INA, 1999, (pp. 53–68) (Bibliothèque de Recherche Musicale).
 Le ‘Savant’ et le ‘Populaire‘, le postmodernisme et la mondialisation, in Musurgia, vol. IX/1, Le Savant et le Populaire, 2002.
 Analyse et idéologie chez Xenakis, in BARDEZ Jean-Michel (ed). Analyse et création musicales, Colloque (1995, Montpellier), Paris, L’Harmattan, 2001, (pp. 87–100) (Musique et Musicologie).
 Du projet bartokien au son : L’évolution du jeune Xenakis, in SOLOMOS, Makis (ed.), Présences de Iannis Xenakis, colloque (1998, Paris), Paris, CDMC, 2001.
 De la musique contemporaine à la société, in Filigrane, No 1, Musicologies ?, 2005, (pp. 49–61)
 Notes pour une comparaison des paradigmes technologiques des musiques électroniques savantes et populaires, in BARBANTI Roberto, LYNCH Enrique, PARDO Carmen, SOLOMOS Makis (ed.), Musiques, arts et technologies : Pour une approche critique, symposium (2000, Montpellier, Barcelone), Paris, L’Harmattan, 2004, (pp. 281–290) (Musique Philosophie).
 Iannis Xenakis, Mercues, PO Editions, 1996; (updated in 2004)
 Formel / Informel  in SOLOMOS, Makis, SOULEZ, Antonia, VAGGIONE, Horacio, Formel Informel : Musique – Philosophie, Paris, L’Harmattan, 2003. His article De l'apollinien et du dionysiaque dans les écrits de Xenakis can be found in SOLOMOS, Makis, SOULEZ, Antonia, VAGGIONE, Horacio, Formel Informel : Musique – Philosophie, Paris, L’Harmattan, 2003, (pp. 49–90) (Musique Philosophie).
 L’espace : musique-philosophie (with Jean-Marc Chouvel: Paris, l’Harmattan, 1998),
 La métaphore lumineuse. Xenakis-Grisey (Paris, l’Harmattan, 2003)
 Musiques, arts, technologies. Pour une approche critique / Music, arts and technologies. Towards a critical approach / Musicas, artes y tecnologías. Por una aproximacion critica (avec Roberto Barbanti et Carmen Pardo: Paris, l’Harmattan, 2004)
 Horacio Vaggione: Composition theory (Contemporary Music Review vol 24 part 4+5)
 Makis Solomos(éd), Espaces composables : essais sur la musique et la pensée musicale d'Horacio Vaggione, Paris, L'Harmattan, 2007,  (ouvrage reprenant en grande partie en version française les textes de "Horacio Vaggione: Composition theory)
 Rythme, temps et émergence in Rythmes de l'homme, rythmes du monde, Séminaire de l'École normale supérieure de la rue d'Ulm 2006-2008, under the direction of Christian Doumet and Aliocha Wald Lasowski, Éditions Hermann, 2010

References

External links 
 Makis SOLOMOS on Centre National de Création musicale
 Makis Solomos on Université Paris 8
  Makis Solomos website
 Makis Solomos on Université Mointpellier 3
 Makis Solomos on France Culture
 Makis Solomos on Symétrie
 Makis Solomos publications on CAIRN
 Makis Solomos, De la musique au son. L’émergence du son dans la musique des xxe-xxie siècles on Transatlantica

20th-century French musicologists
21st-century French musicologists
French music educators
Paris-Sorbonne University alumni
1962 births
Greek emigrants to France
Living people
People from Athens